James Charles Norton (October 20, 1938 – June 12, 2007) was a professional American football player. He was an original member of the Houston Oilers of the American Football League (AFL).  He played at strong safety and punter for their first nine seasons, 1960 to 1968.  Norton was an AFL All-Star for three seasons and holds the league's record for career interceptions. His jersey No. 43 was the first of eight retired by the Oilers/Titans franchise.

Early years
Born and raised in Southern California, Norton graduated from Fullerton Union High School in 1956 and played college football for head coach Skip Stahley at Idaho, alongside future pros Jerry Kramer, Wayne Walker, and Jim Prestel in the Pacific Coast Conference.  Nicknamed "Flamingo," Norton played defensive back and tight end, and also punted and returned kicks for the Vandals. Selected in the seventh round of in the 1960 NFL Draft (75th overall) by the Detroit Lions and the Dallas Texans in the AFL's inaugural draft in 1960, he signed as an original Houston Oiler.

Professional career
Although Norton intercepted only one pass in his rookie season in 1960, he went on to become the AFL's all-time interception leader. In 1961, his first starting season, he snared nine passes and punted with a 40.7-yard average.  In a tight defensive duel in the AFL Championship Game, his four booming punts helped Houston defeat the San Diego Chargers, 10-3, claiming their second AFL championship in as many seasons.

While nursing a slim half-game lead in the Eastern Division in Week 12 of the 1962 AFL season, Norton personally tormented Denver Broncos quarterback Frank Tripucka.  He stopped three Bronco drives with interceptions as the Oilers stole a 34-17 victory and a berth in their third straight AFL Championship Game.  That thriller for the 1962 AFL crown was the league's longest game, a double-overtime contest won by the Dallas Texans, 20-17.
 
As a defensive back, Norton was a steady tackler with a nose for the football. His play earned him All-AFL honors for 1961, '62, '63, and '67, when he scored the only touchdown of his career, returning an interception 56 yards.  His number 43 was the first retired by the Oilers, acknowledging his club-record 45 career interceptions, which he returned for 592 yards and a touchdown, and 519 punts. The Oilers/Titans later retired the numbers of Elvin Bethea, Earl Campbell, Mike Munchak, Bruce Matthews, Warren Moon, Steve McNair, and Eddie George.

See also
 List of American Football League players

References

Additional sources

External links
 Idaho Vandals Athletics Hall of Fame profile
 
 Tennessee Titans – Titans/Oilers Hall of Fame

1938 births
2007 deaths
American football safeties
American football punters
Houston Oilers players
Idaho Vandals football players
American Football League All-Star players
Sportspeople from Fullerton, California
Sportspeople from Glendale, California
Players of American football from California
University of Idaho alumni
American Football League players
National Football League players with retired numbers